Protanypini is a tribe of midges in the non-biting midge family (Chironomidae).

Genera & species
Genus Protanypus Kieffer, 1906
P. caudatus Edwards, 1924
P. forcipatus (Egger, 1863)
P. hamiltoni Saether, 1975
P. morio (Zetterstedt, 1838)
P. pseudomorio Makarchenko, 1982
P. ramosus Saether, 1975
P. saetheri Wiederhol, 1975

References

Chironomidae